Divers face specific physical and health risks when they go underwater with scuba or other diving equipment, or use high pressure breathing gas. Some of these factors also affect people who work in raised pressure environments out of water, for example in caissons. This article lists hazards that a diver may be exposed to during a dive, and possible consequences of these hazards, with some details of the proximate causes of the listed consequences. A listing is also given of precautions that may be taken to reduce vulnerability, either by reducing the risk or mitigating the consequences. A hazard that is understood and acknowledged may present a lower risk if appropriate precautions are taken, and the consequences may be less severe if mitigation procedures are planned and in place.

A hazard is any agent or situation that poses a level of threat to life, health, property, or environment. Most hazards remain dormant or potential, with only a theoretical risk of harm, and when a hazard becomes active, and produces undesirable consequences, it is called an incident and may culminate in an emergency or accident. Hazard and vulnerability interact with likelihood of occurrence to create risk, which can be the probability of a specific undesirable consequence of a specific hazard, or the combined probability of undesirable consequences of all the hazards of a specific activity. The presence of a combination of several hazards simultaneously is common in diving, and the effect is generally increased risk to the diver, particularly where the occurrence of an incident due to one hazard triggers other hazards with a resulting cascade of incidents. Many diving fatalities are the result of a cascade of incidents overwhelming the diver, who should be able to manage any single reasonably foreseeable incident. The assessed risk of a dive would generally be considered unacceptable if the diver is not expected to cope with any single reasonably foreseeable incident with a significant probability of occurrence during that dive. Precisely where the line is drawn depends on circumstances. Commercial diving operations tend to be less tolerant of risk than recreational, particularly technical divers, who are less constrained by occupational health and safety legislation.

Decompression sickness and arterial gas embolism in recreational diving are associated with certain demographic, environmental, and dive style factors. A statistical study published in 2005 tested potential risk factors: age, gender, body mass index, smoking, asthma, diabetes, cardiovascular disease, previous decompression illness, years since certification, dives in last year, number of diving days, number of dives in a repetitive series, last dive depth, nitrox use, and drysuit use. No significant associations with decompression sickness or arterial gas embolism were found for asthma, diabetes, cardiovascular disease, smoking, or body mass index. Increased depth, previous DCI, days diving, and being male were associated with higher risk for decompression sickness and arterial gas embolism. Nitrox and drysuit use, greater frequency of diving in the past year, increasing age, and years since certification were associated with lower risk, possibly as indicators of more extensive training and experience.

Statistics show diving fatalities comparable to motor vehicle accidents of 16.4 per 100,000 divers and 16 per 100,000 drivers. Divers Alert Network 2014 data shows there are 3.174 million recreational scuba divers in America, of which 2.351 million dive 1 to 7 times per year and 823,000 dive 8 or more times per year.  It is reasonable to say that the average would be in the neighbourhood of 5 dives per year.

The aquatic environment

Use of breathing equipment in an underwater environment

Exposure to a pressurised environment and pressure changes

Pressure changes during descent

Pressure changes during ascent

Breathing gases at high ambient pressure

The specific diving environment

Pre-existing physiological and psychological conditions in the diver

Diver behaviour and competence

Failure of diving equipment other than breathing apparatus

Hazards of the dive task and special equipment
Hazards specific to special purpose underwater tools should be described in the article for the tool, but may be added here.

The dive platform and support equipment

See also

References

Sources

Further reading

External links
 Diving Diseases Research Centre

Diving medicine
Underwater diving safety
Underwater diving procedures
Water sport-related lists
Technology hazards